Who is Without Sin (Italian: Chi è senza peccato) is a 1952 Italian melodrama film by Raffaello Matarazzo and starring Yvonne Sanson, Amedeo Nazzari and Françoise Rosay. It is an adaptation of the novel Geneviève by Alphonse de Lamartine. It was part of a series of romantic melodramas that Nazzari and Sanson appeared in during the 1950s.

Cast
Yvonne Sanson as  Maria Dermoz 
Amedeo Nazzari as  Stefano Brunot 
Françoise Rosay as  contessa Lamieri 
Enrica Dyrell as Laura Morresi 
Enrico Olivieri as Nino 
Anna Maria Sandri as Lisetta Dermoz  
Gianni Musy as Dario 
Gualtiero Tumiati as prete 
Teresa Franchini as Adele 
Liliana Gerace as  Agnese  
 Rita Livesi
 Giorgio Capecchi as Il console  
 Giovanni Dolfini as Il direttore del carcere 
 Michele Malaspina as L'avvocato dell' accusa  
 Nino Marchesini as Il maresciallo  
 Dina Perbellini as La madre superiora  
 Amina Pirani Maggi as La sorvegliante del carcere

References

Bibliography 
 Moliterno, Gino. The A to Z of Italian Cinema. Scarecrow Press, 2009.

External links
 

1952 films
1952 drama films
Italian drama films
1950s Italian-language films
Films directed by Raffaello Matarazzo
Films set in Aosta Valley
Films set in Canada
Italian black-and-white films
Melodrama films
1950s Italian films